Elliot Junior Uyi Omozusi (born 15 December 1988) is an English footballer who is currently playing for Barking. Omozusi had two spells with Leyton Orient, playing over 100 games. He also played for Fulham, Norwich City and Charlton Athletic. Omozusi plays primarily at right back, but can also play in the centre of defence or in midfield.

Career

Fulham
Born in Hackney, London, Omozusi attended the Homerton College of Technology. Omozusi made his first team debut for Fulham as a substitute in the League Cup second-round game against Wycombe Wanderers on 20 September 2006. The following month, Omozusi signed a three-year contract with Fulham, which the contract will end until the 2008/09 season. He was sent off in the game against Reading on 3 November 2007 after providing an assist for Fulham's second goal on only his second Premier League appearance for the club. On 3 December 2007 he started at right back against Manchester United at Old Trafford.

On 18 July 2008, Omozusi moved to Norwich City on a season long loan with Fulham having the option of recalling him in January 2009. Omozusi returned to Fulham from his loan spell at Norwich in January 2009. On 30 October 2009, Fulham announced a two-month loan deal with Charlton Athletic, which was subsequently extended until the end of January 2010. He eventually returned to Fulham in March after stopping training with Charlton.

Leyton Orient
In late April 2010, Omozusi was on trial at Leyton Orient and played in a reserve game against Millwall on 28 April. He subsequently signed for Orient on 2 June, where he stayed until a criminal conviction saw him sentenced to prison. On 21 January 2013 Leyton Orient re-signed Omozusi following his release. He told the club's website: "I'm grateful to Leyton Orient for this opportunity given to me. I want to make the most of this second chance and I'm looking forward to helping the team over the rest of the season." He signed a new one-year contract on 2 May 2013.

On 30 January 2014, Omozusi was nominated for the PFA Player in the Community Award for his work with the Leyton Orient Community Sports Programme since his return to the club after his conviction.

Later career
Omozusi joined Cambridge United in June 2015, citing the club's involvement with community projects as a reason for signing. He was released by the club in January 2017 and subsequently joined Brighton-based National League South club Whitehawk until the end of the season in March 2017.

On 17 June 2017, Chelmsford City confirmed the signing of Omozusi. On 23 March 2021, Chelmsford announced Omozusi's departure from the club, alongside club captain Anthony Church.

Career statistics

References

External links
England FA profile

1988 births
Living people
Footballers from Hackney Central
English footballers
England youth international footballers
Association football defenders
Fulham F.C. players
Norwich City F.C. players
Charlton Athletic F.C. players
Leyton Orient F.C. players
Cambridge United F.C. players
Whitehawk F.C. players
Chelmsford City F.C. players
Barking F.C. players
Premier League players
English Football League players
National League (English football) players
Isthmian League players
Black British sportspeople